Lin Xiao (November 1920 – 5 October 2018) was a People's Republic of China politician. He was born in Wei County, Handan, Hebei. He was Chairman of the Henan People's Congress (1988–1989, 1992–1993). He was a delegate to the 7th National People's Congress (1988–1993).

Lin died in Zhengzhou on 5 October 2018, aged 97.

References

1920 births
People's Republic of China politicians from Hebei
Chinese Communist Party politicians from Hebei
Delegates to the 7th National People's Congress
2018 deaths